Big Job is a 1996 educational video game developed by American studio ImageBuilder Software and published by Discovery Channel Multimedia in 1996 for Windows and Macintosh.

References 

1996 video games
Educational video games
Classic Mac OS games
Video games developed in the United States
Windows games